Pandurović is a Serbian and Croatian surname.  People with the name include:
Goran Pandurović (born 1963), Serbian former footballer
Sima Pandurović (1883–1960), Serbian poet

References

Serbian surnames
Croatian surnames